Maurice (539 – 27 November 602) was Eastern Roman emperor from 582 to 602 and the last member of the Justinian dynasty. A successful general, Maurice was chosen as heir and son-in-law by his predecessor Tiberius II.

Maurice's reign was troubled by almost constant warfare. After he became emperor, he brought the war with Sasanian Persia to a victorious conclusion. The empire's eastern border in the South Caucasus was vastly expanded and, for the first time in nearly two centuries, the Romans were no longer obliged to pay the Persians thousands of pounds of gold annually for peace. 

Afterward, Maurice campaigned extensively in the Balkans against the Avars—pushing them back across the Danube by 599. He also conducted campaigns across the Danube, the first Roman emperor to do so in over two centuries. In the west, he established two large semi-autonomous provinces called exarchates, ruled by exarchs, or viceroys of the emperor. In Italy Maurice established the Exarchate of Italy in 584, the first real effort by the empire to halt the advance of the Lombards. With the creation of the Exarchate of Africa in 591 he further solidified the power of Constantinople in the western Mediterranean.

Maurice's successes on battlefields and in foreign policy were counterbalanced by mounting financial difficulties of the empire. Maurice responded with several unpopular measures which alienated both the army and the general populace. In 602, a dissatisfied officer named Phocas usurped the throne, having Maurice and his six sons executed. This event would prove a disaster for the empire, sparking a twenty-six-year war with Sassanid Persia which would leave both empires devastated prior to the Muslim conquests. 

Maurice's reign is a relatively well-documented era of late antiquity, in particular by the historian Theophylact Simocatta. The Strategikon, a manual of war which influenced European and Middle Eastern military traditions for well over a millennium, is traditionally attributed to Maurice.

Life

Origins and early life
Maurice was born in Arabissus in Cappadocia in 539. His father was Paul. He had one brother, Peter, and two sisters, Theoctista and Gordia, the latter of whom was later the wife of the general Philippicus. He is recorded to have been a native Greek speaker, unlike the previous emperors since Anastasius I Dicorus. Sources conflict over his birthplace, with Evagrius Scholasticus recording a descent from “elder Rome”, while the majority of other sources call him a native Cappadocian Greek and the first emperor "from the race of the Greeks".

Maurice first came to Constantinople as a notarius to serve as secretary to Tiberius, the comes excubitorum (commander of the Excubitors, the imperial bodyguard). When Tiberius was named Caesar in 574, Maurice was appointed to succeed him as comes excubitorum.

Persian War and accession to the throne

In late 577, despite a complete lack of military experience, Maurice was named as magister militum per Orientem, effectively commander-in-chief of the Byzantine army in the east. He succeeded General Justinian in the ongoing war against Sassanid Persia. At about the same time he was raised to the rank of patrikios, the empire's senior honorific title, which was limited to a small number of holders. 

In 578, a truce in Mesopotamia came to an end and the main focus of the war shifted to that front. After Persian raids in Mesopotamia, the new magister militum of the east mounted attacks on both sides of the Tigris, captured the fortress of Aphumon and sacked Singara. Sassanid emperor Khosrow sought peace in 579, but died before an agreement could be reached and his successor Hormizd IV (r. 579–590) broke off the negotiations. In 580, Byzantium's Arab allies the Ghassanids scored a victory over the Lakhmids, Arab allies of the Sassanids, while Byzantine raids again penetrated east of the Tigris. Around this time the future Khosrow II was put in charge of the situation in Armenia, where he succeeded in convincing most of the rebel leaders to return to Sassanid allegiance, although Iberia remained loyal to the Byzantines.

The following year an ambitious campaign by Maurice, supported by Ghassanid forces under al-Mundhir III, targeted Ctesiphon, the Sassanid capital. The combined force moved south along the river Euphrates accompanied by a fleet of ships. The army stormed the fortress of Anatha and moved on until it reached the region of Beth Aramaye in central Mesopotamia, near Ctesiphon. There they found the bridge over the Euphrates destroyed by the Persians. 

In response to Maurice's advance, Sassanid general Adarmahan was ordered to operate in northern Mesopotamia, threatening the Roman army's supply line. Adarmahan pillaged Osrhoene, and was successful in capturing its capital, Edessa. He then marched his army toward Callinicum on the Euphrates. With the possibility of a march to Ctesiphon gone Maurice was forced to retreat. The retreat was arduous for the tired army, and Maurice and al-Mundhir exchanged recriminations for the expedition's failure. However, they cooperated in forcing Adarmahan to withdraw, and defeated him at Callinicum.

The mutual recriminations were not laid to rest by this. Despite his successes, al-Mundhir was accused by Maurice of treason during the preceding campaign. Maurice claimed that al-Mundhir had revealed the Byzantine plan to the Persians, who then proceeded to destroy the bridge over the Euphrates. The chronicler John of Ephesus explicitly calls this assertion a lie, as the Byzantine intentions must have been plain to the Persian commanders. 

Both Maurice and al-Mundhir wrote letters to Emperor Tiberius, who tried to reconcile them. Maurice visited Constantinople himself, where he was able to persuade Tiberius of al-Mundhir's guilt. The charge of treason is almost universally dismissed by modern historians; Irfan Shahîd says that it probably had more to do with Maurice's dislike of the veteran and militarily successful Arab ruler. This was compounded by the Byzantines' habitual distrust of the "barbarian" and supposedly innately traitorous Arabs, as well as by al-Mundhir's staunchly Monophysite faith. Al-Mundhir was arrested the following year on suspicion of treachery, triggering war between Byzantines and Ghassanids and marking the beginning of the end of the Ghassanid kingdom.

In June of 582 Maurice scored a decisive victory against Adarmahan near Constantina. Adarmahan barely escaped the field, while his co-commander Tamkhosrau was killed. In the same month Emperor Tiberius was struck down by an illness which shortly thereafter killed him. In this state Tiberius initially named two heirs, each of whom was to marry one of his daughters. Maurice was betrothed to Constantina, and Germanus, related through blood to the great emperor Justinian I, was married to Charito. It appears that the plan was to divide the empire in two, with Maurice receiving the eastern provinces and Germanus the western. 

According to John of Nikiû, Germanus was Tiberius' favored candidate for the throne but declined out of humility. On 5 August, Tiberius was on his deathbed and civilian, military and ecclesiastical dignitaries awaited the appointment of his successor. He then chose Maurice and named him Caesar, after which he adopted the name "Tiberius". Maurice was crowned emperor soon after, on 13 August. Tiberius had reportedly prepared a speech on the matter but at this point was too weak to speak. The quaestor sacri palatii (the senior judicial official of the empire) read it for him. The speech proclaimed Maurice as Augustus and sole successor to the throne. On 14 August 582 Tiberius died and his last words were spoken to his successor: "Let my sovereignty be delivered to thee with this girl. Be happy in the use of it, mindful always to love equity and justice." Maurice became sole emperor, marrying Constantina in the autumn.

Shortly after his ascension the advantage he had gained at the Battle of Constantina was lost when his successor as magister militum of the east, John Mystacon, was defeated at the River Nymphios by Kardarigan. The situation was difficult: Maurice ruled a bankrupt Empire; it was at war with Persia; he was paying extremely high tribute to the Avars, 80,000 gold solidi a year; and the Balkan provinces were being thoroughly devastated by the Slavs.

Maurice had to continue the war against the Persians. In 586 his troops defeated them at the Battle of Solachon south of Dara. In 588, a mutiny by unpaid Byzantine troops against their new commander, Priscus, seemed to offer the Sassanids a chance for a breakthrough, but the mutineers themselves repulsed the ensuing Persian offensive. Later in the year they secured a major victory before Martyropolis. The Sassanid commander, Maruzas, was killed, several of the Persian leaders were captured along with 3,000 other prisoners, and only a thousand men survived to reach refuge at Nisibis. The Byzantines secured much booty, including the Persian battle standards, and sent them, along with Maruzas' head, to Maurice in Constantinople. 

In 590, two Parthian brothers, Vistahm and Vinduyih, overthrew King Hormizd IV and made the latter's son, Prince Khosrow II, the new king. The former Persian commander-in-chief, Bahram Chobin, who had rebelled against Hormizd IV, claimed the throne for himself and defeated Khosrow. Khosrow and the two Parthians fled to the Byzantine court. Although the Senate unanimously advised against it, Maurice helped Khosrow regain his throne with an army of 35,000 men. In 591 the combined Byzantine-Persian army under generals John Mystacon and Narses defeated Bahram Chobin's forces near Ganzak at the Battle of the Blarathon. The victory was decisive; Maurice finally brought the war to a successful conclusion with the re-accession of Khosrow.

Subsequently, Khosrow was adopted by the emperor in order to seal their alliance. The adoption was made through a rite of adoptio per arma, which ordinarily assumed the Christian character of its partakers. However, the chief Byzantine bishops, "despite their best attempts", failed to convert Khosrow. Khosrow rewarded Maurice by ceding to the empire western Armenia up to the lakes Van and Sevan, including the large cities of Martyropolis, Tigranokert, Manzikert, Ani, and Yerevan. Maurice's treaty brought a new status-quo to the east territorially. Byzantium was enlarged to an extent never before achieved by the empire. During the new "perpetual peace" millions of solidi were saved by the remission of tribute to the Persians.

Balkan war

The Avars arrived in the Carpathian Basin in 568. Almost immediately they launched an attack on Sirmium, the keystone to the Byzantine defences on the Danube, but were repulsed. They then sent 10,000 Kotrigur Huns to invade the Byzantine province of Dalmatia. There followed a period of consolidation, during which the Byzantines paid them 80,000 gold solidi a year. In 579, his treasury empty, Tiberius II stopped the payments. 

The Avars retaliated with another siege of Sirmium. The city fell in  581. After the capture of Sirmium, the Avars demanded 100,000 solidi a year.
Refused, they used the strategically important city as a base of operations against several poorly defended forts along the Danube and began pillaging the northern and eastern Balkans. The Slavs began settling the land from the 580s on. 

In 584, the Slavs threatened the capital and in 586 the Avars besieged Thessalonica, while the Slavs went as far as the Peloponnese. After his victory on the eastern frontier in 591, Maurice was free to focus on the Balkans. He launched several campaigns against the Slavs and Avars. In 592 his troops retook Singidunum (modern Belgrade) from the Avars. His commander-in-chief Priscus defeated the Slavs, Avars and Gepids south of the Danube in 593. The same year he crossed the Danube into modern-day Wallachia to continue his series of victories. In 594, Maurice replaced Priscus with his rather inexperienced brother Peter, who, despite initial failures, scored another victory in Wallachia. Priscus, now in command of another army further upstream, defeated the Avars again in 595. The latter now only dared to attack peripherally, in Dalmatia two years later. In the same year the Byzantines concluded a peace treaty with the Avar leader Bayan I, which allowed the Byzantines to send expeditions into Wallachia. 

In 598, Maurice broke the treaty to permit a retaliation campaign inside the Avar homeland. In 599 and 601 the Byzantine forces wreaked havoc amongst the Avars and Gepids. In 602, the Slavs suffered a crushing defeat in Wallachia. The Byzantine troops were now able to hold the Danube line again. Meanwhile, Maurice was making plans for repopulating devastated areas in the Balkans by using Armenian settlers. Maurice also planned to lead further campaigns against the Avar Khaganate, so as to either destroy them or force them into submission.

Domestic policy

In the west, Maurice organised the threatened Byzantine dominions in Italy into the Exarchate of Italy. The Late Roman administrative system provided for a clear distinction between civil and military offices, primarily to lessen the possibility of rebellion by over-powerful provincial governors. In 584, Maurice created the office of exarch, which combined the supreme civil authority of a praetorian prefect and the military authority of a magister militum and enjoyed considerable autonomy from Constantinople. The Exarchate was successful in slowing the Lombard advance in Italy. In 591 he created the Exarchate of Africa along similar lines.

In 597, an ailing Maurice wrote his last will, in which he described his ideas of governing the empire. His eldest son, Theodosius, would rule the eastern provinces from Constantinople; his second son, Tiberius, would rule the western exarchates from Rome. Some historians believe he intended for his younger sons to rule from Alexandria, Carthage, and Antioch. His intent was to maintain the unity of the empire; this idea bears a strong resemblance to the Tetrarchy of Diocletian. However, Maurice's violent death prevented these plans from coming to fruition.

In religious matters, Maurice was tolerant towards Monophysitism, although he was a supporter of the Council of Chalcedon. He clashed with Pope Gregory I over the latter's defence of Rome against the Lombards.

Maurice's efforts to consolidate the empire slowly but steadily succeeded, especially after the peace with Persia. His initial popularity apparently declined during his reign, mostly because of his fiscal policies. In 588 he announced a cut in military wages by a quarter, leading to a serious mutiny by troops on the Persian front. He refused to pay a small ransom in 599 or 600 to free 12,000 Byzantine soldiers taken prisoner by the Avars. The prisoners were killed, and a protesting military delegation, headed by an officer named Phocas, was humiliated and rejected in Constantinople.

Family
Maurice's marriage produced nine known children:
 Theodosius (4 August 583/585 – after 27 November 602). According to John of Ephesus, he was the first heir born to a reigning emperor since the reign of Theodosius II (408–450). He was appointed Caesar in 587 and co-emperor on 26 March 590.
 Tiberius (died 27 November 602)
 Petrus (died 27 November 602)
 Paulus (died 27 November 602)
 Justin (died 27 November 602)
 Justinian (died 27 November 602)
 Anastasia (died c. 605)
 Theoctista (died c. 605)
 Cleopatra (died c. 605)

A daughter, Miriam/Maria, is recorded by the 12th-century chronicler Michael the Syrian and other eastern sources as married to Khosrow II but not in any Byzantine Greek ones; she is probably legendary.

His brother Petrus (c. 550 – 602) became the curopalates and was killed at the same time as Maurice. Petrus married Anastasia Aerobinda (born c. 570), daughter of Areobindus (born c. 550), and had female issue. Maurice's nephew Domitian of Melitene was probably a son of Petrus.

Death
In 602, Maurice, with the lack of money as always dictating policy, decreed that the army should stay for winter beyond the Danube. The exhausted troops mutinied against the emperor. Probably misjudging the situation, Maurice repeatedly ordered his troops to start a new offensive rather than return to winter quarters. His troops gained the impression that Maurice no longer understood the military situation and proclaimed Phocas their leader. They demanded that Maurice abdicate and proclaim as successor either his son Theodosius or General Germanus. Both men were accused of treason. As riots broke out in Constantinople, the emperor, taking his family with him, left the city on a warship heading to Nicomedia, while Theodosius headed east to Persia (historians are not sure whether he had been sent there by his father or if he fled there). Phocas entered Constantinople in November and was crowned emperor. His troops captured Maurice and his family and brought them to the Harbor of Eutropius at Chalcedon.

Maurice was murdered at the harbor of Eutropius on 27 November 602. The deposed emperor was forced to watch his five younger sons executed before he was beheaded himself. 

Empress Constantina and her three daughters were temporarily spared and sent to a monastery. The palace eunuch Scholasticus aided their escape to St. Sophia, but the church turned them over to Phocas, who sent them back to the monastery. A few years later, they were all executed at the harbor of Eutropius when Constantina was found guilty of a conspiracy against Phocas. The entire family of Maurice and Constantina was buried at the monastery of St. Mamas or Nea Metanoia that had been founded by Maurice's sister Gordia. The Persian king Khosrow II used this coup and the murder of his patron as an excuse for a renewed war against the empire.

Legacy

Assessment
Maurice is seen as an able emperor and commander-in-chief, though the description of him by Theophylact may exaggerate these traits. He possessed insight, public spirit, and courage. He proved his expertise on military and foreign affairs during his campaigns against the Persians, Avars and Slavs, and during peace negotiations with Khosrow II. His administrative reforms reveal him as a farsighted statesman, all the more since they outlasted his death by centuries and were the basis for the later introduction of themes as military districts.

His court still used Latin, as did the army and administration, and he promoted science and the arts. Maurice is traditionally named as author of the military treatise Strategikon, which is praised in military circles as the only sophisticated combined arms theory until World War II. Some historians now believe the Strategikon is the work of his brother or another general in his court, however.

His greatest weakness was his inability to judge how unpopular his decisions were. The historian C. W. Previté-Orton, listed a number of character flaws in the emperor's personality:

It was this flaw that cost him throne and life, and thwarted most of his efforts to prevent the disintegration of the empire of Justinian I. The death of Maurice was a turning point. The war against Persia which it caused weakened both empires, enabling the Slavs to permanently settle the Balkans and paving the way for the Arab-Muslim expansion. 

Historian A. H. M. Jones characterises the death of Maurice as the end of the era of Classical Antiquity, as the turmoil that shattered the empire over the next four decades permanently and thoroughly changed society and politics.

Legends

The first legendary accounts of Maurice's life are recorded in the ninth century, in the work of the Byzantine historian Theophanes the Confessor. According to his chronicle Chronographia, the death of the imperial family is due to divine intervention: Christ asked the emperor to choose between a long reign or death and acceptance in the kingdom of heaven. Maurice preferred the second choice.

The same story has been recorded in a short Syriac hagiography on the life of the emperor. It is of East Syrian origin. This was later sanctified by the Eastern Orthodox Church. According to the Syriac author, the emperor asked in prayer to receive a punishment in this world and a "perfect reward" in the kingdom of heaven. The choice was offered by an angel. Anthony Alcock has published an English translation.

According to another legend in the same text, Maurice prevented a nurse from substituting one of his sons so as to save at least one of the heirs of the empire.

In a Montenegrin epic the legendary Prince Nahod Momir (Momir the foundling) and his sister Grozdana are related to the Emperor and his sister Gordia. In the epic, the epithet "the foundling" reflects Maurice's adoption by the Emperor Tiberius, and by the imperial dynasty of Justin. In the Bosnian epic, the Emperor is called Mouio Tcarevitch (Mouio the son of the emperor).

See also

 List of Byzantine emperors

Notes

References

Sources

 

 
 
 
 
 
 
 
 
 
 
 
 
 
  
 
 
 
 
 Walford, Edward, transl. (1846) The Ecclesiastical History of Evagrius: A History of the Church from AD 431 to AD 594, Reprinted 2008. Evolution Publishing, Merchantville, NJ .

Further reading
 
 
 
 

 
539 births
602 deaths
6th-century Byzantine emperors
7th-century Byzantine emperors
7th-century executions by the Byzantine Empire
Justinian dynasty
Byzantine Cappadocians
Patricii
Magistri militum
Comites excubitorum
Executed Byzantine people
Ancient Greek military writers
Roman military writers
People of the Roman–Sasanian Wars
People executed by decapitation
6th-century Byzantine writers
Executed monarchs
7th-century murdered monarchs